Savicheva may refer to:

Tanya Savicheva (1930–1944), Russian child diarist who survived the Siege of Leningrad during World War II
Yulia Savicheva (born 1987), Russian singer who performed for Russia in the 2004 Eurovision Song Contest

See also
Believe Me (Yulia Savicheva song), the Russian entry in the Eurovision Song Contest 2004, performed in English by Julia Savicheva
If Love Lives In Your Heart (Yulia Savicheva album), the second official album from Yulia Savicheva
Vysoko (Yulia Savicheva album), the debut album of Yulia Savicheva